Till We Meet Again is a romantic adventure drama film directed by Thai filmmaker Bank Tangjaitrong and starring Johan Matton, Linnea Larsdotter, Emrhys Cooper, and Vithaya Pansringarm. Tangjaitrong's feature film debut, it was written and produced by Johan Matton, who also has a lead role. It won awards at several film festivals, including the Audience and Jury prizes at the Long Beach International Film Festival.

Plot
Erik is a young writer unhealthily dependent on his girlfriend Joanna. With their relationship on the brink, they travel to Thailand to try to fix what’s left of it, only to find themselves bitter and distant. Erik wanders through Thailand alone, battling his loneliness and his inability to take care of himself. Meanwhile, Joanna runs into and reconnects with her childhood friend, David. A chance encounter with three free-spirited backpackers opens up the world to Erik and changes his life.

Cast

 Johan Matton as Erik
 Linnea Larsdotter as Joanna
 Emrhys Cooper as David
 Vithaya Pansringarm as Surachai
 Astrea Campbell-Cobb Miranda
 Timothy Ryan Hickernell as Jamie
 Elly Han as Cecile
 James Kacey as Sam
 Rachel Rossin as Laura

Release
Till We Meet Again premiered in selected US theaters and video on demand on November 25, 2016,

Reception
Till We Meet Again received positive reviews.

References

External links 
 
 

American adventure drama films
Films set in 2016
English-language Thai films
Films set in Thailand
American independent films
Films set in 2015
Films set in Bangkok
Films set in New York City
2016 films
2016 independent films
2010s adventure drama films
2016 drama films
2010s English-language films
2010s American films